Hoheria sexstylosa, the long-leaved lacebark or ribbonwood, is a species of flowering plant in the family Malvaceae, endemic to New Zealand. The Latin specific epithet sexstylosa means "six styles".

In cultivation it is frost-hardy but requires a protected site. The cultivar 'Stardust' has gained the Royal Horticultural Society's Award of Garden Merit.

Distribution
Distribution in the North Island is from Waikato and the Coromandel Peninsula south to Wellington, while in the South Island natural populations appear to be in North West Nelson, inland Marlborough and the Banks Peninsula. Other populations may be naturalised.

References

sexstylosa
Endemic flora of New Zealand
Taxa named by William Colenso